Positive Innovation for the Next Generation, or PING, is a youth-led organization that implements health- or youth-related technology projects along with high school-age and college mentorship programs. The organization is based out of Gaborone, Botswana but is beginning to expand its projects out of Botswana into other African countries.

PING’s stated goal is to "help address health and development problems by using technology in an innovative way, and creating more problem solvers in the local population."

To achieve this goal PING ensures that whenever and wherever its technology and software projects expand, the mentorship programs expand as well. This intention is to place local youth being trained with IT skills to support and maintain the software, wherever a PING tech project is running. PING’s former name was the Botswana Association for Positive Living (BAPL), which was founded in January 2009 in Gaborone, Botswana.

History of PING 

The formation of PING was inspired by senior thesis research on people living with HIV and ARVs in Botswana, which PING founder Katy Digovich conducted during her junior year at Princeton University in summer 2007. Noting the ubiquity of cell phones in Botswana, she was inspired to start a project to send reminders to PLWAS (People Living With AIDS) to take their medication, remember their doctor’s appointments, and to send them their lab test results. When Katy won a 2008 Compton Mentor Fellowship grant, she began working with Motswana-born Lesedi Bewlay, to develop the software. Digovich and Bewlay formed a team of six to constitute the nonprofit organization that was to become Botswana Association for Positive Living (BAPL). In January 2009 the group became a registered NGO through the Register of Societies in Gaborone. In 2011 the organization changed its name from BAPL to Positive Innovation for the Next Generation (PING).

PING Technology Projects 
The Kgakololo Project is a Short Message Service (SMS)-based support, reminder and information system for patients living with HIV/AIDS. It provides patients with medication and doctor appointment reminders, lab test results, emotional support, feedback to questions and assistance in emergency situations via SMS and phone call.

The Health Systems Post Office project is an integration engine developed by PING that allows the sharing of relevant information via the cellular network between disparate health information systems across Botswana.

The Disease Surveillance and Mapping Project utilizes HP Palm Pre 2s and software developed by PING to collect malaria case data, notify to the Ministry of Health of a malaria outbreak and tag both data reports and disease surveillance information with GPS coordinates.

The Safe Male Circumcision Project is a SMS reminder, support and information system for men undergoing circumcision that sends supportive messages, appointment reminders and provides them with other crucial information.

The Patient Referral Project relies on a system that PING has built which assists HIV testing centers with referral and tracking of clients that test for HIV, the system tracks referrals and sends appointment reminders for both HIV positive and HIV negative clients.

The Lab Test Result Project uses the Post Office project and other PING software to SMS the availability of laboratory test results to enrolled patients.

PING Youth Programs 
PING youth programs/projects focus on IT skill-building and bridging of the digital divide. PING's two-armed approach of bringing youth and technology together contribute to the organization’s sustainability and long-term goals, which include having local youth maintaining and supporting many of PING’s mobile health and education projects as they get rolled out at a national level.

PING Partners 
 Mascom (Botswana)
 Hewlett Packard
 Ministry of Health Botswana
 Project Concern International
 I-TECH
 Clinton Foundation Health Access Initiative

References

External links
 

Youth organisations based in Botswana
Organisations based in Gaborone